Griffin Island is a mountain in Barnstable County, Massachusetts. Great Beach Hill is located south of Griffin Island.

References

Mountains of Massachusetts
Mountains of Barnstable County, Massachusetts